Tetris Friends was an online Tetris game developed by Tetris Online, Inc. Registered users were able to compare their scores with their friends and with the entire community. It was the only official Flash implementation of Tetris made by the Tetris company itself. At the time, it was also the only official Tetris platform that had advertisements play before a match. Tetris Friends had over a million registered users.

Tetris Friends featured six single-player modes and five multiplayer modes. Playing any game mode gave a user Tokens. They could be used to unlock new skins and Tetrimino styles, although a premium "ruby" currency also existed. The version available on Facebook only had four of the modes available on the official website and contained had no coin system, but featured a special mode.

All game modes except Tetris 1989 and N-Blox used the SRS rotational system, featured the hold function which allowed players to save a block for future use, and had a quad-Tetrimino preview that allows players to see the next few upcoming blocks.

Tetris Online, Inc ceased all operations on May 30, 2019. As such, Tetris Friends permanently shut down on that date.

Game Modes

Single Player

Marathon 

In Marathon Mode, players have to clear a specified number of lines while trying to score as many points as possible. Clearing multiple lines with one piece is worth more than the actual number cleared. For instance, clearing a single line is worth only one, while clearing four lines with a single piece is worth eight lines. Once the goal has been reached, the level and speed increases and a new, higher goal is set. There are fifteen levels in total. The game ends once level fifteen is completed, and the score is recorded and added to the high score list if the user has a registered account.

Sprint 

Sprint Mode requires players to clear forty lines as quickly as possible. The time required to clear all the lines is recorded as the score. The speed is automatically set to the lowest setting.

Ultra 

Ultra Mode challenges players to score as many points as possible in two minutes. Clearing multiple lines with a single piece scores more points. Special moves called t-spins are also worth extra points. If the player loses by reaching the top, the score does not count and is not recorded in the high score list.

Survival 

Survival Mode is similar to Marathon Mode. Players have to clear ten lines per level while scoring as many points as possible. Every line cleared is worth only one, unlike in Marathon Mode. There are a total of twenty levels, each one at a higher speed than the last. Once all twenty levels are beaten, the player enters the bonus level. The bonus level is a semi-invisible level. Blocks alternate between being visible and invisible. The blocks are invisible for increasing longer time periods as the level progresses. There is no limit on how many lines the player can clear, and the player only loses when the blocks reach the top of the field. This game mode is not available on the Facebook version.

Tetris 1989 

This mode attempts to simulate the classic Game Boy version of Tetris. There are two modes within this game. Mode A challenges players to clear as many lines as possible. Once certain goals are reached, the speed increases. Mode B requires players to clear a specified number of lines. These are similar to other game modes, but the rotational system of the blocks is slightly different, and there is no hold feature, making this mode more difficult. This game mode is not available on the Facebook version.

N-Blox 

N-Blox mode is developed by British web designer Paul Neave. It does not use many of the new features such as the hold function and the four block preview. Players are also not allowed to change the keyboard controls, which they can in every other mode. The goal is to score as many points as possible. The speed increases after a certain number of lines are cleared. This is similar to other standard Tetris modes available in other games. This mode is not available on the Facebook version.

BlockStar 

This mode is similar to the N-Blox and Tetris 1989 modes. There are no hold pieces, ghost pieces, or four piece preview. The game is endless and challenges players to achieve the high score. This game is a remake of the first Tetris game that was released on Facebook. It is only available to play on Facebook, and is not found on the Tetris Friends website.

Multiplayer

Battle 2P 

In Battle 2P, the player plays against a recorded game previously played by the player or any other player. The goal is to knock out the other player three times by forcing them to reach the top of the screen. Players can send garbage, blank lines of tiles that cannot be cleared normally, to the other player by clearing multiple lines with a single piece, by clearing lines with consecutive pieces, or by performing the t-spin maneuver. There is a two-minute time limit. If no one has won by the end of two minutes, the player that has been knocked out the most times loses. If both have the same number of knock-outs, then the player that sent the most lines of garbage to the other player is the winner. Players earn stars when they win. Once enough stars have been earned, the player is promoted to the next rank and matched up with better players. There are a total of twenty ranks attainable.

Battle 6P 

This mode is very similar to Battle 2P. The player is pitted against five other opponents. The opposing players are also recordings as in Battle 2P. There is a target that constantly alternates between the other five players. When garbage is sent by the player, the person that the target is current pointing at is the one that receives the garbage. Knock-outs are awarded to the person that sent the most garbage to the knocked-out player, so timing of attacks is important in earning knock-outs. The player with the highest knock-out-to-knocked-out ratio after two minutes is the winner. If that is tied, then number of lines of garbage sent is the tie-breaker, as in Battle 2P. By doing well, the players can earn stars, which promotes them to new ranks. Doing poorly will cause players to lose stars. As in Battle 2P, there are twenty ranks in the mode. This mode is not available on the Facebook version.

Sprint 5P 

In Sprint 5P, the player plays against four others players in the basic Sprint Mode. The players are previously recorded as in Battle 2P. The goal is to clear forty lines before the other players. Players earn stars by placing first or second, and they lose stars by placing fourth of fifth. Once enough stars are earned, they advance to a new rank just as in Battle 2P.

Arena 

Arena is the only live multiplayer mode. It pits up to six players against each other in real time. It works similarly to Battle 6P, except that when a player is knocked out, they are out of that round. There are also items available in the game. When special flashing blocks are cleared, the player is awarded with a randomly selected item that harms the opponent in some way. Items can cause more garbage, speed up the game for the opponent, or even make the blocks invisible, among other things. The player is awarded points based on how well they do, how many lines of garbage they sent, and how many people they knocked out. Once a player earns 1,000 points, they are promoted to the next rank. If their points reach 0 because they lost points in a match, they are demoted a rank. This mode is not available on the Facebook version.

Rally 8P 

In Rally 8P, the player has to race to the bottom of the field by clearing all the blocks. The player has to race against seven other previously recorded players. The mode features cascade rules, which allows blocks to fall all the way down if the blocks below them are removed. Items are also available in this mode as in Arena. Wins earn stars, which allow promotion like most of the other multiplayer modes. This mode is not available on the Facebook version.

Reception 
Tetris Friends met with positive reviews overall. PC Review gave it a 4.0/5, stating that "Gameplay is smooth and the Web site is set up cleanly and very easy to navigate. It's simple, but effective." It received an average score of 4.7/5 with over 100 reviews at Jay Is Games.

Shutdown 
On April 25, 2019, a banner appeared on the homepage of Tetris Friends stating that "Tetris Friends will no longer be available after May 31st, 2019." This coincided with the shutdown of Tetris Online, Inc (the platform's parent company). Around this time, the platform made all customization options free for all players. On May 31, 2019, Tetris Friends permanently shut down alongside Tetris Online, Inc.

References 

2008 video games
Flash games
Tetris
Video games developed in the United States
Multiplayer and single-player video games
Windows games